The San Jose Holiday Parade is in San Jose, California. The parade is considered one of the "Top 25 Parades in America". Celebrities and famous locals appear as Grand Marshals and numerous bands from across America are invited to participate in the parade.

History

The San Jose Holiday Parade tradition began in 1981 when Santa Claus arrived in grand style for the opening of the Christmas in the Park display at Plaza de Cesar Chavez, in Downtown San José. Santa appeared on the roof of the St. Claire Hotel (currently the Westin), vanished from its rooftop and magically appeared at the hotel entrance. Santa leaped into a horse-drawn carriage waiting to escort him up Market Street to the park. In the first year the parade consisted of a couple of fire engines, City of San José vehicles and Santa.

The next year, the parade became the Christmas in the Park Parade. It began on Park Avenue and circled around Plaza de Cesar Chavez. The parade featured a handful of units including the San Jose State University Spartan Marching Band, a couple of floats and children’s groups. This tradition continued for a number of years until the parade became too large just circling the park. The 2008 parade is on December 7th.

In 1987, KNTV, San José’s only network affiliate television station, began to broadcast the parade throughout the Bay Area as the parade gained popularity. In 1993, the Christmas in the Park Parade became the San Jose Holiday Parade, beginning a new tradition. In 1994, the parade began its expansion to become a major California event and showcase California’s third largest city. Giant helium balloons, professionally made floats and marching musical units throughout North America were invited to join the line of march.

At the start of the Millennium, the parade was named "One of the Top 25 Parades in America" by the International Festival and Events Association and USA Today. In 2006, International Festival and Event professionals honored the San Jose Holiday Parade with the Grand Pinnacle Award. This award is presented annually to recognize the overall top international event.

The 2010 parade was held on December 5th.  The honorary Grand Marshals will be two World Series champs from the San Francisco Giants.

This parade went on hiatus in 2020 & will return in 2021,

External links

 San Jose Holiday Parade

References

Recurring events established in 1981
Christmas and holiday season parades
Culture of San Jose, California
Tourist attractions in San Jose, California
Parades in the United States
Festivals in the San Francisco Bay Area